Karaikal South is a legislative assembly constituency in the Union territory of Puducherry in India. Karaikal South assembly constituency was part of Puducherry (Lok Sabha constituency).

Members of Legislative Assembly

Election results

2021

See also
 List of constituencies of the Puducherry Legislative Assembly
 Karaikal district

References 
 

Assembly constituencies of Puducherry
Karaikal